Pikeliškės Manor is a former residential manor in Pikeliškės village, Vilnius District Municipality, Lithuania. Currently it is occupied by Pikeliškės library.

References

Manor houses in Lithuania
Classicism architecture in Lithuania